Hege Stendahl (born 27 April 1967) is a Norwegian cyclist. She was born in Trondheim. She competed at the 1984 Summer Olympics in Los Angeles, where she placed 19th in the individual road race.

References

External links

1967 births
Living people
Sportspeople from Trondheim
Norwegian female cyclists
Olympic cyclists of Norway
Cyclists at the 1984 Summer Olympics